The Daily Press is a newspaper published in Escanaba, Michigan, United States. The newspaper serve Delta, Schoolcraft, and northern Menominee counties. The Daily Press publishes editions Monday through Saturday. The newspaper offices are located at 600 Ludington St. in downtown Escanaba, Michigan.

From 1922 to 1978, the Daily Press was known as The Escanaba Daily Press.

External links
The Daily Press website

References 

Newspapers published in Michigan